Bissell Bridge may refer to:
Bissell Bridge (Connecticut), over the Connecticut River, connecting the towns of Windsor and South Windsor, Connecticut, U.S.
Bissell Bridge (Massachusetts), over Mill Brook in Charlemont, Massachusetts, U.S.